Pascal Margerit (born 12 February 1971) is a French ice hockey player. He competed in the men's tournament at the 1992 Winter Olympics.

Career statistics

References

1971 births
Living people
Chamonix HC players
Diables Rouges de Briançon players
Drakkars de Caen players
HC Morzine-Avoriaz players
Les Aigles de Nice players
Olympic ice hockey players of France
Ours de Villard-de-Lans players
Ice hockey players at the 1992 Winter Olympics
People from Thonon-les-Bains
Sportspeople from Haute-Savoie